Bermuda competed at the 2004 Summer Paralympics in Athens, Greece. The team included two athletes, both of them female, and won no medals.

Sports

Equestrian

See also
Bermuda at the Paralympics
Bermuda at the 2004 Summer Olympics

References 

Nations at the 2004 Summer Paralympics
2004
Summer Paralympics